Gáspár Károlyi (in Protestant usage, Károli, 1529?, Nagykároly – 31 December 1592, Gönc) was a Hungarian Calvinist pastor.

References

16th-century Hungarian people
Hungarian Calvinist and Reformed clergy
Translators of the Bible into Hungarian
Calvinist and Reformed ministers
People from Carei
Hungarian people of Serbian descent
1529 births
1591 deaths